Alfred Christy (17 January 1818 – 23 March 1876) was an English cricketer who played for Surrey. He was born in Southwark and died in "Aperfield Court", Sevenoaks, Kent.

Christy made a single first-class appearance, in 1857, against Cambridgeshire. Batting as a tailender, he scored a duck in each innings in which he batted.

Christy's brother Frederick played three first-class matches in the 1840s.

External links
Alfred Christy at Cricket Archive

1818 births
1876 deaths
English cricketers
Surrey cricketers